Bataidari system is a sharecropping, an agricultural practice where a landowner lends his land to another who spends money and labour and the produce is shared by the owner and the tenant. it is prevalent in the state of Bihar in India where nearly 35% of cultivable land is under this system.

History
The system was prevalent during British Raj in many parts of India, including fertile plains of Punjab, in other places the jotedar system was prevalent. Since more of the tenants were poor labourer they had to borrow money from money lenders for cultivation, this perpetuated the poverty cycle. Though land reforms were implement across Bihar after independence through the Bataidari Act, but deemed exploitative against labourer and lead to violence, especially caste violence between labour communities and landowners. In the past, landforms have been demanded and even made a political plank in state assembly elections, especially by Left parties.

See also
 Feudalism in India

References

Agricultural labor
Landowners
History of agriculture in India
History of Bihar (1947–present)
Labor history
Labour in India
Indian feudalism
History of Punjab
Poverty in India
Agriculture in Bihar